África Sempere Herrera (born 25 September 1992) is a Spanish handballer for CB Atlético Guardés and the Spanish national team.

When she was a little girl, she overcame a leukemia.

Achievements

Spanish national team
Women's World University Handball Championship:
 Winner: 2016

Atlético Guardés
Spanish División de Honor Femenina:
Winner: 2016/17

References 

Living people
1992 births
Spanish female handball players
Sportspeople from Elche
Expatriate handball players
Spanish expatriate sportspeople in Denmark